Qinzhou (postal: Yamchow, Jyutping: Jam1 zau1 (Canton) /Ham1 zau1 (Local) ) is a prefecture-level city in south-central Guangxi, southern China, lying on the Gulf of Tonkin and having a total population of 3,302,238 as of the 2020 census whom 1,400,134 lived in the built-up (or metro) area made of Qinbei and Qinnan urban Districts.

History
The area originally belonged to Guangdong and was transferred to Guangxi in 1965. The city was originally a county Qinxian (postal: Yamhsien). From the beginning of the present era, Qinzhou (Wade-Giles: K'in-chou) was for many centuries "the center of Chinese overland trade with Indo-China".

Administration
The Qinzhou municipal region comprises two (county-level) districts and two counties.
 
Population data is as of 2009.

 Qinnan District - pop. 570,000
 Qinbei District - pop. 650,000
 Lingshan County - pop. 1,400,000
 Pubei County - pop. 810,000

Geography and climate
Despite its latitude and location on the Gulf of Tonkin coast, Qinzhou has a monsoon-influenced humid subtropical climate (Köppen Cwa), with short, mild winters, and long, hot and humid summers. Winter begins dry and rather sunny but becomes progressively wetter and cloudier. Spring is generally overcast and often rainy, while summer continues to be rainy though is the sunniest time of year; the coastal location moderates summer daytime temperatures, but there are 10.9 days annually with rainfall totaling at least . Autumn is sunny and dry. Mean annual rainfall is just above , the majority of which, on average, occurs from June to August in large totals in excess of  each month. With monthly possible sunshine ranging from 17% in February to 55% in September, the city receives an average of 1,721 hours of bright sunshine annually.

Nature
Critically endangered Chinese white dolphins still live in the waters of these areas such as in Sanniang Bay. They are threatened by various factors such habitat loss.

Economy
In 2004, the GDP totaled 17,5 billion yuan, and the GDP per capita was  yuan.

Grain cultivation, hog husbandry, fruit growing and fishing are of significance in the surrounding areas.

Qinzhou is also one of the centers of turtle farming; according to one estimate, as of c. 2012, over 10,000 families in the Qinzhou area were involved in that industry, raising 1.25 million turtles at their homes and farms. Around 1,500 tons of turtles are sold by Qinzhou's turtle farmers to the national market every year.

Oysters are also a significant product from Qinzhou. Oyster farming has reached 230,000 tons a year in an area of 10,100 hectares (38.9 square miles) It has become so popular, every year from December 1–28, Qinzhou hosts its annual Oyster Festival. Gourmet food is served and the oyster is celebrated all month long. People from all over the world go to enjoy oysters prepared in a variety of ways. There are demonstrations where chefs prepare oysters the way you want right in front of you.

Famous people
Liu Yongfu (1837–1917) soldier of fortune, creator of the Black Flag Army
Han Feng (1956–) Tobacco monopoly apparatchik outed in 2010 as a "Chinese Casanova"
 Chen Xingqian, one of the founders of Qinzhou's turtle farming industry
 Feng Zicai (1818 – 1903)

Sister cities
Qinzhou currently has a sister city, Kuantan, Malaysia.

References

 
Cities in Guangxi
Prefecture-level divisions of Guangxi
Gulf of Tonkin